The Vermont Catamounts represented the University of Vermont in Women's Hockey East Association play during the 2016–17 NCAA Division I women's ice hockey season.

Offseason
April 5: Amanda Pelkey ('15) won a Gold Medal with Team USA at the 2016 IIHF World Championships in British Columbia.

July 29: Eve-Audrey Picard(Canada) and Taylor Willard (USA) were selected to their respective National Development Teams.

Recruiting

Roster

2016–17 Catamounts

Schedule

|-
!colspan=12 style=""| Regular Season

|-
!colspan=12 style=""| WHEA Tournament

Awards and honors

Melissa Black was named the WHEA Goaltender of the month for December, 2016.

As a member of the Czech National Team, Sammy Kolowrat was named the top Defender of the Olympic Qualifying Tournament in Arosa, Switzerland.

Eve-Audrey Picard was the WHEA Rookie of the month for February.

Eve-Audrey Picard (Forward) was named to the WHEA Pro-Ambitions Rookie All-Star Team.

Madison Litchfield (Goaltender) was named to the WHEA Second All-Star Team.

Taylor Willard (Defender) was named to the WHEA Second All-Star Team.

References

Vermont
Vermont Catamounts women's ice hockey seasons
Cata
Cata